Sir George Douglas, 2nd Baronet (1 March 1754 – 4 June 1821) was a Scottish soldier and politician.

Biography
The eldest son of Admiral Sir James Douglas, 1st Baronet, of Springwood Park, he succeeded to the title in 1787. From 1784 to 1806 he sat in Parliament for Roxburghshire, through the influence of the Duke of Roxburghe. On 16 October 1786 he married Lady Elizabeth Boyle, daughter of John Boyle, 3rd Earl of Glasgow; they had a son and two daughters.

References

1754 births
1821 deaths
Baronets in the Baronetage of Great Britain
Grenadier Guards officers
King's Own Scottish Borderers officers
British MPs 1784–1790
British MPs 1790–1796
British MPs 1796–1800
UK MPs 1801–1802
UK MPs 1802–1806